Westwind School Division No. 74 or Westwind School Division is a public school authority serving the County of Warner No. 5 and Cardston County.

Schools
Cardston 
 Cardston Elementary School (K-5)
 Cardston Jr. High School (6-8)
 Cardston High School (9-12)

Glenwood
 Spring Glen Elementary School (K-5)

Hill Spring
 Spring Glen Junior High School (6-9)

Magrath
 Magrath Elementary School (K-6)
 Magrath Jr./Sr. High School (7-12)

Mountain View
 Mountain View School (K-9)

Raymond
 Raymond Elementary School (K-6)
 Raymond Jr. High School (7-9)
 Raymond High School (10-12)

Stirling
 Stirling School (K-12)

Westwind Alternate School

Westwind Colony Schools

See also
List of Alberta school boards

References

External links
Westwind School Division No. 74

School districts in Alberta